Haultain is a surname, and may refer to:

 Arnold Haultain, British writer
 Frederick W. Haultain, politician in Canada West
 Frederick W. A. G. Haultain, premier of the Canadian Northwest Territories and son of Frederick W. Haultain
 H. E. T. Haultain, Canadian engineer and inventor
 Lynne Haultain, Australian radio broadcaster
 Theodore Haultain, New Zealand politician
 Willem Haultain de Zoete, Dutch admiral

See also
 Haultain, Saskatoon in Canada, named for Frederick W. A. G. Haultain